Leopold Hainisch (1891–1979) was an Austrian actor and film director.

Selected filmography

Actor
 Ulli und Marei (1948)
 Viennese Girls (1949) – Karl Haslinger
 Cabaret (1954) – Leopold Holzinger
 Walking Back into the Past (1954)
 The Last Ten Days (1955) – Generalfeldmarschall Wilhelm Keitel
 Castle in Tyrol (1957) – Direktor Rothmüller
 Arena of Fear (1959) – Riley
 Charley's Aunt (1963) – Aristide Raby (uncredited)
 The Hamburg Syndrome (1979) – Professor Placek (final film role)

Director
 Falstaff in Vienna (1940)
 Earth (1947)
 Ulli and Marei (1948)
 Veronika the Maid (1951)
 The Spendthrift (1953)

References

Bibliography
 Charles P. Mitchell. The Great Composers Portrayed on Film, 1913 through 2002. McFarland, 2004.

External links
 

1891 births
1979 deaths
Austrian male film actors
Austrian film directors
Film people from Vienna